Narva Reservoir is a reservoir by Narva River, shared by Russia and Estonia.

The reservoir was constructed during 1955–1956, during the Soviet era. It provides water to Narva Hydroelectric Station (installed capacity 125 MW, located on the Russian side and owned by the power company TGC-1) and cooling water to the Estonian Narva Power Plants.

The overall water exchange rate is high (about 30 times a year), with some almost stagnant areas. The ecological status is estimated as "good" (as of 2007).

References

Baltic Klint
Reservoirs in Russia
Reservoirs in Estonia
Reservoirs in Leningrad Oblast
International lakes of Europe
Estonia–Russia border
RNarva
Reservoirs built in the Soviet Union